Sayadieh is a seasoned fish and rice dish from Syrian cuisine/Lebanese cuisine, made with cumin and other spices, as well as fried onions. The spice mix is called baharat in Arabic and its preparation varies from cook to cook but may include caraway, cinnamon, cumin and coriander. 

Historically it was a fisherman's meal found along the Lebanese and Syrian coast, but the dish can now be found throughout the Middle East. Several variants of the meal exist, but most variants involve a sauce prepared with fried onions. Depending on the degree of caramelization the sauce can range from light brown to a deep black with a strong, pungent taste. The rice is often colored by cooking it with caramelized onion. The dish can be made with a variety of fishes, but usually firm, white fishes, such as haddock or cod. are preferred. Entire fishes are used, and the fish head and bones are often used to produce stock and flavor the rice and the sauce. The dish is garnished with slivered almonds and toasted pine nuts, as well as fried onions.

See also
 List of fish dishes
 List of rice dishes

References

Arab cuisine
Lebanese cuisine
Fish dishes
Rice dishes